Edward Joseph McIlvenny (21 October 1924 – 18 May 1989) was a Scottish footballer, who most notably captained the United States national team in their 1–0 upset of England in the 1950 FIFA World Cup.

Early years
McIlvenny learned to play football as a youth, and while playing for Scottish club Morton, he was selected for a Scottish Junior League team on a tour of the north of Scotland. In 1947, he signed with the Welsh club Wrexham, then in the Third Division North of the English Football League, but he only played seven games for them before moving to the US in 1949 to stay with his sister.

Career
In the United States, McIlvenny initially abandoned his football career in order to take an industrial job. According to his son, McIlvenny initially worked as a plumber's mate, also delivering eggs and milk. He later excelled with the Philadelphia Nationals of the American Soccer League, where he teamed up with US national team captain Walter Bahr. The Nationals won the league, with McIlvenny being declared the competition's outstanding player in June 1949. He was subsequently selected to join the U.S. national team during their 1950 World Cup appearance. He was given the honour of being captain for the game against England "because he was British", and in that game, it was his throw-in that led to the U.S. goal. Although he was not a U.S. citizen, he had declared his intention of becoming one and thus was eligible to play, according to the rules of the United States Soccer Football Association at the time.

However, he never did gain citizenship. Earlier that same year, he had played in an All-Star game against Manchester United and his play attracted the attention of United manager Matt Busby, who offered him a spot on the team after the World Cup. Upon his return to England, the English press called him "The Yank from the Tail of the Bank" (a reference to the sand bank that finishes at Greenock). He only had two appearances for them, however, and transferred to Waterford United of the League of Ireland instead. He played for them for four years and then returned to England to play for Headington United, after which he retired from playing and ran a football school.

Honors
He was enshrined in the National Soccer Hall of Fame, along with the other members of the 1950 World Cup team, in 1976. He is also featured in the Scottish Football Museum.

See also
List of United States men's international soccer players born outside the United States

References

External links
 

1924 births
1989 deaths
Scottish footballers
United States men's international soccer players
National Soccer Hall of Fame members
1950 FIFA World Cup players
Manchester United F.C. players
Wrexham A.F.C. players
Greenock Morton F.C. players
Oxford United F.C. players
Scottish emigrants to the United States
Waterford F.C. players
English Football League players
League of Ireland players
League of Ireland XI players
American Soccer League (1933–1983) players
Philadelphia Nationals players
Association football wingers
American soccer players
Scottish expatriate sportspeople in the United States
Expatriate soccer players in the United States
Scottish expatriate footballers
Footballers from Greenock